The Mayfield Fellows Program is a university program that offers students in-depth training and experience in high-tech entrepreneurship.

The program, originally called the "Technology Ventures Co-op" was founded in 1996 at Stanford University and expanded in 2001 to include the University of California, Berkeley.  The two programs each have a slightly different focus.  At Stanford, the students are juniors, senior, and co-terminal masters students, primarily in engineering and science.  At Berkeley, the students are generally graduate students in business or engineering.

The students benefit from doing case studies in the classroom, interning at high-tech startup companies, and meeting with senior-level mentors from those companies in the industry.

Stanford University 

At Stanford University, the Mayfield Fellows Program (MFP) offers an unparalleled opportunity for students to develop theoretical understanding, practical knowledge and leadership skills needed for starting and growing technology companies. Each year 12 students are selected to participate in this nine-month program, combining a sequence of courses, mentoring and networking activities, and a paid internship at a Silicon Valley startup.

The students enter a program that covers marketing, strategy, finance, ethics and leadership. The student Fellows are later introduced to various VC firms' portfolio companies for a summer internship.

Alumni and Companies Founded

 Alex Gurevich (2005) -  sayheyhey, ooma
 Armen Berjikly (2001) - Experience Project, Kanjoya, Motive Software
 Amy Chang (1999) - Accompany
 Ben Jun (1996) - Cryptography
 Ben Olding (1999) - txteagle
 Camille Hearst (2004) - Kit
 Chris Gori (1996) - Cryptography
 Clara Shih (2004) - Hearsay Labs
 Dave Merrill (2001) - Sifteo, Elroy Air
 Eileen Long (1998)  - FairSoftware
 Graham Miller (1998) - Marketcetera
 Guha Jayachandran (2003) - Cruxlux
 Jeff Seibert (2007) - Increo, Crashlytics
 Jonah Greenberger (2008) - Bright
 Jonathan Berger (2004) - Maroon Labs
 Josh McFarland (1999) - TellApart
 Josh Reeves (2005) - Gusto
 Josh Schwartzapel (2007) - Cooliris
 Justin Rosenstein (2003) - Asana
 Justin Smith (2003) - Prophetic Media
 Karthik Rau (1999) - SignalFx
 Kelly Bayer Rosmarin (1998) - CustomInsight
 Kevin Systrom (2005) - burbn/Instagram
 Kit Rodgers (1996) - Cryptography
 Mark Shaw (1997) - Guidewire Software, Strava
 Melissa Miao (2001) - CMP Healthcare
 Mike Krieger (2007) - burbn/Instagram
 Moritz Sudhof (2011) - Motive Software
 Nathan Eagle (1999) - Jana
 Nolan Glantz (1996) - Cithaeron Partners/The Cantor Exchange
 Ping Wang (2001) - VAE Corporation
 Scott Bowie (1998) - Zao Technology Innovators
 Scott Kleper (1999) - Context Optional
 Steve Garrity (2004) - Hearsay Labs
 Tristan Harris (2006) - Apture
 Vivian Chiang (1998) - Orbit Baby
 Yael Pasternak (1998) - MayasMom

References

External links 
Mayfield Fellows Program at Stanford
Mayfield Fellows Program at Berkeley
[http://www.inc.com/magazine/20110401/best-courses-2011-mayfield-fellows-at-stanford-university.html Inc Magazine - Best Courses 2011 Mayfield Fellows
Providing students with a front-row seat to all the drama that Silicon Valley has to offer]
Quora Mayfield Fellows

United States educational programs